The following article is a summary of the 2022–23 football season in France, which is the 89th season of competitive football in the country and will run from July 2022 to June 2023.

National team

France national football team

Friendlies

UEFA Nations League

Group 1

FIFA World Cup

Group D

Knockout stage

UEFA Euro 2024 qualifying

Group B

France women's national football team

Friendlies

UEFA Women's Euro

Group D

Knockout stage

2023 FIFA Women's World Cup qualification

Group I

Tournoi de France

UEFA competitions

UEFA Champions League

Qualifying rounds

Third qualifying round

|}

Group stage

Group D

Group H

Knockout phase

Round of 16

|}

UEFA Europa League

Group stage

Group B

Group G

Group H

Knockout stage

Knockout round play-offs

|}

UEFA Europa Conference League

Qualifying phase and play-off round

Play-off round

|}

Group stage

Group D

Knockout stage

Round of 16

|}

Quarter-finals

|}

UEFA Youth League

UEFA Champions League Path

Group stage

Group D

Group H

Domestic Champions Path

First round

|}

Second round

|}

Knockout round

Play-offs

Round of 16

|}

UEFA Women's Champions League

Qualifying rounds

Round 1

Semi-finals

|}

Final

|}

Round 2

|}

Group stage

Group A

Group C

Knockout phase

Quarter-finals

|}

League season

Men

Ligue 1

Ligue 2

Championnat National

Women

Division 1 Féminine

Cup competitions

2022–23 Coupe de France

Final

2022 Trophée des Champions

2022–23 Coupe de France Féminine

2022 Trophée des Championnes

References 

2022–23 in French football
Seasons in French football
2022 in association football
2023 in association football